Yantar may refer to:
Yantar, Kaliningrad, a Special Economic Zone in Russia
Yantar (satellite), a series of reconnaissance satellites
Yantar (ship), a ship in the Russian Navy
Soyuz 11, a Soviet spaceflight that used the call sign "Yantar"

See also
Jantar (disambiguation)
Jandar (disambiguation)
 Amber, fossilized tree resin